Donald Watson Davis (November 23, 1849 – June 4, 1906) was a politician from Northwest Territories, Canada.

Born in Londonderry, Vermont, he served in the Union army during the U.S. Civil War.

He came west and then north to southern Alberta in 1869. He was employed as a whiskey pedlar at Fort Whoop-up when the North-West Mounted Police made their march west in 1874. He turned his hand to building the NWMP's Fort Macleod and Fort Calgary.

He was general manager of the I.G. Baker and Company in the Alberta district in the 1880s.

Donald was elected to the House of Commons of Canada in the 1887 Canadian federal election to be one of the first Members of Parliament to represent the North-West Territories. He represented the new [[Alberta (Provisional District) riding. He was re-elected in 1891 Canadian federal election, to serve a second term in the House of Commons. His election over Edmonton contender Frank Oliver was a sign that Calgary was passing Edmonton as the main centre on the western Prairies.

References

External links
 

1849 births
1906 deaths
People from Londonderry, Vermont
Pre-Confederation Alberta people
Conservative Party of Canada (1867–1942) MPs
Members of the House of Commons of Canada from the Northwest Territories